Wild 'N Out is an American sketch comedy and improv game show series that was created and is hosted by musician and comedian Nick Cannon currently airing on VH1. It debuted on July 28, 2005 on MTV.

In April 2019, the series had been renewed through Season 16, with 90 new episodes to be produced. On June 19, 2019, it was announced that Wild 'N Out would expand to VH1, with a special Summer season premiering on July 7, 2019.

Premise

Similar in premise to shows such as Whose Line Is It Anyway?, the series puts two teams of comedians against each other in a series of Wild 'n Out games which are all basically "improvisational" comedy games. The Teams are the "Red Squad", which was the team name until Season 5 where they became the "Platinum Squad" and were permanently captained by Cannon; and the "Black Squad", led by a celebrity guest until Season 7 where the situation was reversed with Cannon becoming the Black Squad team captain and the celebrity guest leading the Platinum Squad.

For Season 8, the colors were revamped once again with the Gold Squad replacing the Black Squad. The Gold Squad was led by Cannon while the celebrity guest remained captain of the Platinum Squad. For Seasons 9-14, Cannon led his original Red Squad team color while the Black Squad team color returned also.

For Season 15, the teams were revamped as Nick Cannon leads the Old School team, comprising older cast members and a legendary special guest, and cast member DC Young Fly and another celebrity guest lead the New School Team, comprising some newer cast members.

For Season 16, the teams changed once again. In a format similar to Old School vs New School, Nick Cannon leads Team Revolution and the celebrity guest, appearing as a hologram, leads Team Evolution.

For Season 17, it's reverted back to the "Old School" vs. "New School" format. Cannon and a legendary special guest will lead the "Old School" team, and the celebrity guest will lead the "New School" team.

After three such games, the two teams square off against each other in the final round of the game called 'WildStyle', in which they must deliver a punchline directed at their opponent's team member(s) within a freestyle rap. The comedians "beef" with each other; however, some are impersonal jokes. Although similar to Whose Line, the "points don't matter", the teams score one point per round victory during the normal rounds, plus one point per favorably judged punchline during 'Wild Style', which makes it similar in format to the improv show ComedySportz.

Each episode also includes a musical performance, occasionally by the guest captain for the Black/Platinum Squad (Nick Cannon performed with Migos in Season 6 in the episode featuring Chanel Iman). At times, the musical guest comes out just before 'Wild Style' as the judge for the beefs. Starting with season 2, the teams now compete for a "Wild 'N Out" Championship belt (Million Dollar Chain in Season 16 and 17) which if the Black Squad wins, the team captain gets to take home the belt but if Cannon's team win he gets to keep the belt (chain).

Production
In November 2012, it was announced that the series would be returning in 2013 after a six-year hiatus. The revival features celebrities, along with the show's current cast. The fifth season premiered on MTV2 to 1.1 million total viewers, making it the highest-rated telecast in the network's history. The show would continue on MTV2 for three seasons.

On June 9, 2016, Wild 'N Out was renewed for an eighth season, which would mark the series' return to MTV. The season premiered on August 4, 2016.

Controversy
On July 14, 2020, Nick Cannon was fired by ViacomCBS after making racist and anti-Semitic remarks during an episode of his podcast Cannon's Class with Professor Griff. Cannon endorsed conspiracies about Jewish control of finance, claimed that Jews had stolen the identity of "black people as the 'true Hebrews'", and cited Louis Farrakhan, who is labeled as an anti-semite by the Southern Poverty Law Center and Anti-Defamation League.

Cannon also called white people "savages" who were "closer to animals", claiming the "only way that they can act is evil", citing the pseudoscientific melanin theory. A statement from ViacomCBS noted that the company's relationship with Cannon was terminated due to his promotion of "hateful speech and ... anti-Semitic conspiracy theories". Two days later, Cannon released an apology for his remarks regarding anti-Semitism, saying, "I want to assure my Jewish friends, new and old, that this is only the beginning of my education." He also demanded for complete ownership for Wild 'n Out, and an apology from ViacomCBS for his termination.

When Fox was aware of his podcast, the network immediately consulted him and accepted his public apology, allowing him to remain host of The Masked Singer. He donated his first paycheck to the Simon Wiesenthal Center, in light of the incident. On February 5, 2021, ViacomCBS announced that Wild 'N Out would resume production with Cannon as host, saying that Cannon has "taken responsibility for his comments" and "worked to educate himself" through conversations with Jewish leaders. New episodes began airing on April 6 that same year.

Cast

Episodes

Season 1 (2005)

 Orlando Jones/Cassidy/Biz Markie
 Christina Milian/Common
 Ying Yang Twins
 Kanye West/Tracee Ellis Ross
 Eva Marcille/T.I.
 Kenan Thompson/The Pussycat Dolls
 Fonzworth Bentley/Trillville
 Omarion/Lil Wayne
 Kevin Hart/David Banner
 Method Man/Lil Scrappy

Season 2 (2006)

The second season contains ten episodes which were broadcast from February 2 to April 6, 2006, on MTV.

 Lil Jon/Three 6 Mafia
 Tyra Banks/Sean Paul
 Cedric the Entertainer/Dem Franchise Boyz/Da Brat/Jermaine Dupri
 Marques Houston/Rhymefest/Kanye West/Bobby Brown
 Rev Run/Young Jeezy/Akon
 Kelly Rowland/Ne-Yo
 Mike Jones
 Charlie Murphy/Busta Rhymes
 Wayne Brady/Paul Wall
 Mike Epps/Joy Bryant/Pitbull

Season 3 (2006)

The third season contains eight episodes which were broadcast from August 10 to October 5, 2006, on MTV.

 Big Boi/Lil Jon/Purple Ribbon All Stars
 Fat Joe/Clipse/Pharrell Williams
 Andy Milonakis/Field Mob
 Warren Sapp/Method Man
 Jamie Kennedy/Chamillionaire
 E-40
 Ray J/Yung Joc
 Talib Kweli/Lupe Fiasco

Season 4 (2007)

The fourth season contains 20 episodes which were broadcast from May 12 to September 6, 2007, on MTV.

 Snoop Dogg
 Ne-Yo
 Lloyd
 Steve-O/Big Daddy Kane
 Fabolous
 Brooke Hogan/Three 6 Mafia
 Redman
 Swizz Beatz
 Tara Reid/Izzy Battle
 Young Buck
 Pauly Shore/The Fixxers
 Jim Jones
 Serena Williams/Crime Mob
 Common
 Terry Crews/Pretty Ricky
 Paula DeAnda/Baby Boy da Prince
 Big Boy/Mike Jones
 Sommore/DJ Unk
 Bruce Bruce/Paul Wall
 Katt Williams/Huey

Season 5 (2013)

The fifth season contains 12 episodes which were broadcast from July 9 to September 24, 2013, on MTV2. This is the first season of the show to air since the fourth season in 2007.

 Kevin Hart/DJ Khaled
 Mac Miller
 2 Chainz/Lil Duval
 Vinny Guadagnino/Mike Epps/Talib Kweli
 French Montana/Guy Code Cast
 A$AP Rocky
 Amar'e Stoudemire/Macklemore & Ryan Lewis
 Lil Duval/Charlamagne Tha God/Joey Bada$$
 Chanel West Coast/Pusha T
 Joe Budden/Big Boi
 MGK
 Kevin Hart/Kirko Bangz

Season 6 (2014-2015)

The sixth season contains 16 episodes which were broadcast from July 2, 2014, to February 4, 2015, on MTV2.

 Rick Ross/MMG
 Nelly
 Skylar Diggins/Vic Mensa
 Bow Wow/Que
 Crissy Teigen/PWD/Michael Strahan
 Austin Mahone
 RiFF RaFF
 Asher Roth/Drita D'Avanso/Troy Ave
 Tech N9ne/MURS
 Amber Rose/Wiz Khalifa
 Brandon T. Jackson/Jim Jones/Wonder Broz/Sage the Gemini
 Maino/Yo Gotti/Rich Homie Quan
 Chanel Iman/Migos
 Peter Gunz/Angel Haze
 Sage the Gemini
 Adrien Broner/Yo Gotti/Rich Homie Quan

Season 7 (2015-2016)

The seventh season contains 16 episodes which were broadcast from June 10, 2015, to January 6, 2016, on MTV2. There are also stand up specials after the episodes in this season are finished.

 Fabolous/Kevin Hart
 Rae Sremmurd
 T-Pain
 Pete Wentz/Fetty Wap
 Zendaya/Ne-Yo
 Nick Young/A-Town/Snacks/French Montana
 Ty Dolla $ign/IceJJFish
 Mack Wilds/DJ Drama/O.T. Genasis
 Dej Loaf
 A$AP Ferg/Hailey Clauson/Marty Baller
 Jordin Sparks/Snoop Dogg/Arsonal da Rebel
 Shaquille O'Neal/Migos
 Ray J/Lil Duval
 Remy Ma/The Breakfast Club/K Camp
 Tommy Lister/Conceited/Hitman Holla
 Fat Joe/Desus Nice/The Kid Mero

Season 8 (2016-2017)

The eighth season contains 21 episodes which were broadcast from August 4, 2016, to April 20, 2017 on MTV, marking the first time in almost a decade that the show aired new episodes on its original network.

 Tyga/Scott Disick
 Iggy Azalea/Travis Mills
 Waka Flocka/Tate Kobang
 Travis Scott
 Bella Thorne/Jadakiss
 T.I./Young Dro
 Lil Dicky/Rachel Hilbert
 Keke Palmer/Erykah Badu/Mack Wilds/Curren$y
 Timbaland/Les Twins/Jay Leno/Lyfe Jennings/Kehlani
 Stevie J/Joseline Hernandez/Yo Gotti
 2 Chainz
 K. Michelle/Antonio Cromartie/Flo Rida
 Trevor Jackson/DRAM
 Chris Paul/iLoveMemphis
 Samantha Hoopes/Russel Peters/Don Benjamin/Jeremih
 Trina
 Lil Bibby/Ta'Rhonda Jones/Dreezy
 Migos
 Faizon Love/2 Milly
 Deontay Wilder/Tory Lanez
 Omarion/Safaree

Season 9 (2017)

The ninth season contains 16 episodes which were broadcast from June 29 to October 5, 2017, on MTV.

 Chance the Rapper/Saba
 Vic Mensa/Method Man
 Dave East/Nev Schulman
 Lil Yachty
 Blac Chyna/ItsAMovie
 The Cast of the New Edition Story/Nick Grant
 Tami Roman/Lecrae
 Remy Ma/Papoose/Conceited/Hitman Holla
 Killer Mike/Run the Jewels
 Young M.A.
 Rick Ross/Slab/YesJulz
 Jake Miller/Shameik Moore
 Lil Rel Howery/Mia Kang/Ayo & Teo
 LeSean McCoy/SNS/Kid The Wiz/Todrick Hall
 DJ Self/Demaris Lewis/Kodie Shane
 Wendy Williams/Blac Youngsta/Cipha Sounds

Season 10 (2017-2018)

The tenth season contains 16 episodes which were broadcast from November 30, 2017, to March 1, 2018, on MTV.

 Desiigner/Kranium
 Wu-Tang Clan
 Sereyah/Fatboy SSE
 Santa Claus/Slick Woods/Jacquees
 Pete Davidson/PnB Rock
 MGK/Sommer Ray
 Ayo & Teo
 Keyshia Cole/Smokepurpp
 Fabolous/Elijah Kelley
 The Combs Brothers
 Tee Grizzley
 Wyclef Jean/Sara Sampio
 KYLE/Sky
 Gary Owen/CyHi the Prynce/21 Savage
 A Boogie wit da Hoodie/Don Q/CyHi the Prynce
 A$AP Mob

 International Women's Day Special

Season 11 (2018-2019)

The 11th season consists of 21 episodes and premiered on March 15, 2018, on MTV, two weeks after the end of Season 10, and concluded September 29, 2019, on VH1.

 All That Cast/Shameik Moore
 PRETTYMUCH/Nafessa Williams
 Laurie Hernandez/Yvng Swag
 Rick Ross/Slab
 Tyga
 T.I./Hustle Gang
 Keke Palmer/Vic Mensa
 Baby Ariel/BJ the Chicago Kid
 Dolph Ziggler/Rich the Kid
 Prince Royce/Shameik Moore
 Blac Youngsta/Cordell Broadus
 Amara LeNegra/Bobby Lytes/Derez De'Shon
 Winnie Harlow/Rapsody/Shameik Moore
 Rachel Lindsay/Vic Mensa/Kent Jones
 Dream Doll/Caroline Lowe/Roy Woods
 Matt Barnes/Mariah Lynn/Kap G
 Justine Skye/Vic Mensa
 Affion Crockett/Karlie Redd/Vic Mensa
 Mikey Day/Jack & Jack
 Trick Daddy/Famous Dex
 Wild 'N Out: Veterans vs Rookies/Maino

Season 12 (2018-2019)

The twelfth season consists of 26 episodes and premiered on August 17, 2018, on MTV.

 Chance the Rapper/Reesey Nem
 Ludacris/Denzel Curry
 Azealia Banks/Lil Yachty/JaVale McGee
 Rae Sremmurd
 Chloe x Halle
 Trevor Jackson/Deon Cole
 Love & Hip-Hop: Atlanta
 Jonathan Cheban/Lais Ribeiro/Ayo & Teo
 Matt Triplet/Yung Joc/Curt Chambers
 Dwight Howard/Brett Grey/Trinidad Cordona
 Tiffany Hayes/Angel McCoughtry/Jay Rock
 BlocBoy JB
 Sasha Banks/Yung Joc/MadeinTYO
 Jacquees
 So So Def Anniversary Special
 Goodie Mob Reunion
 Young M.A./Erica Mena/O.G. Parker/Justin Hires
 O.T. Genasis/Nate Robinson
 Andre Drummond/Kandi Burruss/Lil Baby
 Shaun T/Tyron Woodley/YBN Crew/O.G. Parker
 Desiigner/Love & Hip Hop: Atlanta
 Tiny Harris/Zonnique/Bun B
 Big Tigger/Rico Nasty
 Lil Durk/Bernice Burgos
 Trae tha Truth/Josephine Skriver
 85 South Show/James Davis/Eric Bellinger/F.L.Y.

Season 13 (2019)

The thirteenth season was filmed in Atlanta from October 29 to November 11, 2018. It premiered on February 1, 2019, on MTV, and continued on VH1 from July 7 to September 15, 2019.
 Lil Duval
 Soulja Boy
 Sky/Doja Cat
 Tory Lanez
 Marlon Wayans/Anderson .Paak/DaniLeigh
 Wiz Khalifa
 Ski Mask The Bird God/LightSkin Keisha/B.Smyth
 Toya Wright/Tiny Harris/Monica Brown/Shy Glizzy
 Vinny Guadagnino/Ronnie Ortiz-Magro/Karol G
 Carmella/R-Truth/Sofi Tukker
 Swizz Beatz/Kash Doll
 Perez Hilton/Lay Lay/JID
 Shiggy/Lil Mosey
 T-Pain/MoneyBagg Yo
 Love & Hip Hop: Hollywood/Kash Doll
 NeNe Leakes/Brentt Leakes/Diggy Simmons/Smino
 Marshmello/Sherrie Silver/O.G. Parker/Yella Beezy
 G Herbo/Eva Marcille
 Akon/Buddy (rapper)/Sarunas J. Jackson
 Jimmy O. Yang/Michael Rainey Jr./Pardison Fontaine
 Ne-Yo/Kodie Shane
 Cynthia Bailey/YFN Lucci
 Lupe Fiasco
 A$AP Ferg
 Denzel Curry
 TK Kravitz

Season 14 (2019-2020)

The fourteenth season was filmed in Atlanta from May 14 to 25, 2019. The season premiered on August 17, 2019, with two episodes and a special that aired on MTV. The rest of the season began airing on VH1 starting on January 7, 2020, and ended on April 14, 2020.

 Dinah Jane 
 2 Chainz
 Mario
 Ginuwine
 Tre'Davious White/Blac Chyna/Asian Da Brat
 Kenya Moore
 Lil Tjay/Polo G/Lala Kent/Corinne Foxx
 Roblé Ali/DDG
 The New Day/Saweetie
 Tarik Cohen/Ted Ginn Jr./Lil Dope Boy
 Kirk Franklin
 Davido
 Black Ink Crew: Chicago/DJ Luke Nasty
 Koffee
 ScHoolboy Q/Smacc
 Charmaine/Ceaser/Flipp Dinero
 Blueface
 PnB Rock
 Casanova/Ms. Juicy
 Naomi/Jimmy & Jey Uso/Rich The Kid/83 Babies
 Taylor Bennett/Tana Mongeau
 Danielle Herrington/Justina Valentine
 Travis Mills/PnB Rock/Calboy
 YFN Lucci
 King Harris/Young Nudy
 Floribama Shore/Spoken Reasons/Hoodrich Pablo Juan
 The W.M.A.'s: The Wildest Moments Awards

Season 15 (2020-2021)

The fifteenth season was filmed in Atlanta from December 9 to 18, 2019, and premiered on April 21, 2020, on VH1, just a week after the end of Season 14. The season continued airing on April 6, 2021, and ended on May 4, 2021, on VH1.

 Chance the Rapper/Lil Durk/T.I.
 Doja Cat/Big Daddy Kane
 EarthGang/Bone Thugs-n-Harmony
 DaBaby/Too $hort
 Jack Harlow/Tank
 Lil Keed/Karlae/La La Anthony
 Kranium/Sean Paul/Tahiry Jose
 Miles Brown/Marsai Martin/Saint Jhn/EPMD
 Lil Baby/Ying Yang Twins
 DDG/Tommy Davidson
 Cordae/Biz Markie
 Reginae Carter/Sisqó
 Kiana Ledé/Doug E. Fresh
 Montell Jordan/Montel Williams
 Travis Thompson/Cyn Santana/Jonathan Bennett
 Pivot Gang/Naughty By Nature
 Cartel Crew/Cassidy
 FatBoy SSE/Lost Boyz/K Chrys
 Trinidad James/Black Ink Crew: Compton
 Cuban Doll/Juvenile
 AmbjaayHeadkrack/Da Brat
 Rapsody/MC Lyte
 24kGoldn/Fabo 
 OMB Peezy/Big Tigger
 Tyla Yaweh/Yung Joc
 Cory Gunz/Peter Gunz/Queen Naija/Donnell Rawlings

Season 16 (2021)

The sixteenth season was filmed in San Bernardino, California, from June 8 to 17, 2021. It premiered on August 10, 2021, and concluded on December 7, 2021, on VH1.

Fat Joe
Latto
BRS Kash
Morray
Coi Leray
Masego
Gary Owen/DW Flame
DDG
NLE Choppa
Jucee Froot
24KGoldn
Fousheé
Freddie Gibbs
Loni Love/VVVanessa
Rick Ross/ItsAMovie
Kirk Frost/Rasheeda/Money Mo
CJ
Erica Banks
42 Dugg
Malaysia/Nick Cannon
Too $hort
Big Freedia
Hotboii
Mooski
Karlie Redd/DDG/TraeTwoThree
Zaytoven/FO15
Trina
 Murda Count Harlem

Season 17 (2022)

The seventeenth season was filmed in Jersey City, New Jersey, from October 14 to 25, 2021. The season premiered on February 22, 2022, and concluded on May 3, 2022, on VH1.

Fat Joe
G-Eazy/Kossisko
D Smoke
Jimmie Allen
LisaRaye/DC Young Fly
Dave East
Wyclef Jean/Wonda Prince
Miles Brown/Tommy Davidson/Darius McCrary/Mariah the Scientist
Baby Tate
James Davis/DreamDoll
Tommy Davidson/Yung Bleu
J.I the Prince of N.Y.
Donnell Rawlings/Belly
Capella Grey
Spice/Hitman Holla
EST Gee/Naughty By Nature
Saucy Santana
Toosii
Symba
Eric Bellinger
Fivio Foreign
LightSkinKeisha
Dearica Hamby/Kelsey Plum/Justina Valentine
Tommy Davidson/Sleepy Hallow
Sierra Gates/Yung Pooda
Larry June
Maxo Kream
Jackie Christie/Brandi Maxiell/DW Flame/TraeTwoThree
Kid 'N Play

Season 18 (2022)

The eighteenth season was filmed in Covington, Georgia, from March 29 to April 9, 2022. It premiered on June 21, 2022, and concluded on August 2, 2022, on VH1.

Bobby Shmurda/YOYO
Marsai Martin/Emmanuel & Phillip Hudson
Coco Jones
112
Juelz Santana
Adam Waheed/Symba
Hannah Stocking/Special Ed
Chrisette Michelle/Novi Brown
Fireboy DML/Nems
Josh Richards/P-Lo
Bun B
Jabari Banks/Jordan L. Jones/OMB Peezy/Nems
Lakeyah/Andrew Caldwell
Jordan Chiles/Loui
Flex Alexander/Soul for Real
Sherry Cola/Jay Sean/C. King
Anthony Hamilton
Álvaro Diaz
DJ Quik/Rubi Rose
Ray Vaughn
Godfrey
Zack Lugo/DW Flame/C. King
La'Ron Hines/Toosii/Shawty
Tyron Woodley/Nems
Smiley
Bradley Constant/Trillville
FatsDaBarber/Thatboyfunny
Monaleo/Nems/EJ King
Jon B./TraeTwoThree
Lil Keed/Big Tigger

Seasons 19 & 20 (2023)

The nineteenth and twentieth seasons were filmed concurrently in Fayetteville, Georgia, from August 30 to September 23, 2022. Both seasons will premiere in 2023 on VH1.

Adam Waheed
Angela Simmons
Antonio Brown
Ari Fletcher
Baby Tate
Berner
Bianca Belair
Blueface
Bruce Bruce
Bryce Vine
Carla Hall
Chance the Rapper
Chet Hanks
Chris Ball
Christian Combs
Cuttino Mobley
Da'Vonne Rogers
DaniLeigh
DeRay Davis
DJ Duffey
DJ Quik
Earn Your Leisure
EarthGang
Earthquake
Eva Marcille
Fabolous
Girll Code
GloRilla
Hannibal Burress
Hazel-E
Hitmaka
Ian Dunlap
J. Valentine
Jahi Winston
James Kennedy
Jason Lee
Javon Walton
Jay Pharaoh
Jayda Cheaves
Jermaine Dupri
JiDion
Jilly Anais
Joe Albanese
Joey Bada$$
K Camp
Kai Cenat
KaMillion
Katt Williams
Keith L. Williams
KennyHoopla
Kevin Hart
Kid n' Play
Kirk Franklin
LaRussell
Lil Duval
Lil Meech
London on da Track
Mark Curry
Markell Washington
Michael Rapaport
Monet X Change
Ms. Pat
Ne-Yo
Nelly
Next
Orlando Jones
Pi'erre Bourne
Quincy Brown
Ray J
Red Grant
Rich Homie Quan
Robert Williams III
Rodney Perry
Rowdy Rebel
RSVP
Sean Kingston
Sevyn Streeter
Sidney Starr
Stephanie Acevedo
The Street Profits
Tamar Braxton
Tank
Taylor Bennett
Tevin Campbell
Too $hort
Travie McCoy
Travis Porter
Tye Tribbett
Xzibit
Young Dro

References

External links

2000s American sketch comedy television series
2010s American sketch comedy television series
2020s American sketch comedy television series
2005 American television series debuts
American television series revived after cancellation
English-language television shows
Improvisational television series
Television shows set in Los Angeles
Television shows set in New York City
Television shows set in Atlanta
MTV original programming
MTV2 original programming
VH1 original programming
Hip hop television